The 1997–98 Pepsi Triangular Series was a One Day International cricket tournament held in India in April 1998. It was a tri-nation series between the Australia, India and Zimbabwe. Australia defeated India in the final to win the tournament.

Matches

1st ODI

2nd ODI

3rd ODI

4th ODI

5th ODI

6th ODI

Final

References

External links
 Series home at ESPN Cricinfo

International cricket competitions from 1997–98 to 2000
1998 in Indian cricket